The 2017 World RX of Portugal was the second round of the fourth season of the FIA World Rallycross Championship. The event was held at the Pista Automóvel de Montalegre in Montalegre, Vila Real.

Supercar

Heats

Semi-finals
Semi-Final 1

Semi-Final 2

Final

Standings after the event

 Note: Only the top five positions are included.

References

External links

|- style="text-align:center"
|width="35%"|Previous race:2017 World RX of Barcelona
|width="40%"|FIA World Rallycross Championship2017 season
|width="35%"|Next race:2017 World RX of Hockenheim
|- style="text-align:center"
|width="35%"|Previous race:2016 World RX of Portugal
|width="40%"|World RX of Portugal
|width="35%"|Next race:Incumbent
|- style="text-align:center"

Portugal
World RX
World RX